Rose Mutombo Kiese (born 1960) is a DR Congo lawyer and politician. She is national president of the Permanent Consultative Framework for Congolese Women (CAFCO). In 2021 she was appointed Minister of Justice and Keeper of the Seals in the Lukonde government.

Life
Rose Mutombo Kiese was born in Kananga on 19 March 1960. She trained as a lawyer and worked as a magistrate at the General Prosucutor's Office at the Council of State. She was National President of the Permanent Consultative Framework for Congolese Women (CAFCO).

After several months of negotiations on the composition of the Sacred Union of the Nation in early 2021, in April 2021 Rose Mutombo was announced as Minister of Justice within the Lukonde government.

References

1960 births
Living people
Women government ministers of the Democratic Republic of the Congo
Justice ministers
Female justice ministers
21st-century Democratic Republic of the Congo women politicians
21st-century Democratic Republic of the Congo politicians
People from Kananga
Democratic Republic of the Congo lawyers